Cymatura mabokensis is a species of beetle in the family Cerambycidae. It was described by Stephan von Breuning and Pierre Téocchi in 1973. It is known from the Central African Republic.

References

Endemic fauna of the Central African Republic
Xylorhizini
Beetles described in 1973